Pure Gold is a compilation album by American singer and musician Elvis Presley,  issued in 1975 by RCA Records with catalog number ANL1-0971(e) as part of the RCA budget Pure Gold series of albums. At the time of this release, Presley was at the final stage of his career; he was focused more on the country music market, where he had a string of chart-topping records in recent years. This short and rather haphazard collection focused more on his earlier Rock and Roll material than later hits. Although considered a mediocre compilation at best, Pure Gold became an extremely popular seller in the wake of Elvis' unexpected death in August, 1977.

Content
"Fever", "It's Impossible", and "In The Ghetto" are heard in true stereo; "Kentucky Rain" utilized the mono single version, with mild rechanneled or "fake stereo" effect. The other six tracks on the album are original 1950s monophonic recordings with "stereo effect reprocessed from monophonic", or "fake stereo". When RCA reissued the album on compact disc in 1992, the  "fake stereo" tracks were restored to their original mono sound. The album was certified Gold on September 12, 1977, Platinum on March 20, 1988, and 2× Platinum on March 27, 1992, by the RIAA.

The front cover photo features Elvis from his Aloha from Hawaii concert in January, 1973. The original back cover featured a list of other albums available in the RCA Pure Gold series. The album was reissued in the early 1980s with the catalog number AYL1-3732(e) as part of the RCA budget 'Best Buy' series.

Track listing

External links

1975 compilation albums
Elvis Presley compilation albums